Mt. Edgecumbe High School (abbreviated MEHS) is a public boarding high school  in Sitka, Alaska in the United States.  Located on Japonski Island, across Sitka Harbor from the northwestern corner of downtown Sitka, the school is situated on a portion of Sitka's former World War II-era military installations.  Established in 1947 after the military abandoned the area, the school was originally operated by the federal Bureau of Indian Affairs (BIA) as part of a network of boarding high schools, which included schools in Eklutna and Wrangell.  After several decades of operation by the BIA, the school was briefly closed in the 1980s before being reopened by the Alaska Department of Education, which operates it today.

For administrative and statistical purposes, MEHS is considered by the state to be a school district, albeit one consisting of only one school. The enrollment was 421 students as of October 1, 2014.  The student body, both in its former and current incarnations, is predominately from rural Alaska.  For a time, until the resolution of the Tobeluk v. Lind lawsuit and the subsequent construction of K–12 schools in most rural communities, MEHS was one of the few viable options many rural students had to obtain a high school education, as BIA schools in rural villages only provided schooling until the eighth grade.  Today, the school still attracts rural residents, primarily students from communities too small to qualify for state school funding, plus exceptional athletes who seek to develop their skills beyond what competition their local school districts can provide.

The mountain, in turn, was named for George, Earl of Edgecumbe, by British Captain James Cook in 1778. Outside of the school year, the campus has hosted summer camps such as the Sitka Fine Arts Camp, which is now located on the campus of the defunct Sheldon Jackson College, as well as a portion of the inaugural Outer Coast College Summer Seminar in 2018.

History

Mt. Edgecumbe was established on Japonski Island in Sitka in 1947 on the then-recently deserted Sitka World War II installation. It was originally administered by the Bureau of Indian Affairs and, along with Native Alaskan boarding schools in others parts of the state, helped educate today's leaders from rural areas. In fact, there are several MEHS graduates in the current Alaska Legislature.  In the 1980s, the school was closed for a year before being transferred to the State of Alaska, which has administered the institution since.

Governance
The Alaska State Board of Education serves as the school board for Mt. Edgecumbe High School.

Educational model
Mt. Edgecumbe is known for developing educationally-disadvantaged students from rural Alaska. Ninety percent of its students attend universities and college after graduation. All students are required to learn a non-indigenous second language, usually Chinese or Japanese.  Students are also required to familiarize themselves with an array of technologies, and to participate in the academic environment;  for example, classes are held on Saturdays once a month.  MEHS faculty also are each in charge of an "extended families" scheme made up of groups of students. The faculty members eat dinner with their students at the school cafeteria every Thursday to help build personal connections with students and help strengthen the community at the school.

MEHS is known for its unique and highly emphasized science program, which includes a high-level genetics program. IBM offers internships to graduating students.

Extracurriculars

Mt. Edgecumbe's sports teams are known as the Braves, for male athletes, and the Lady Braves for female athletes.  The school is especially recognized for both its boys' and girls' basketball teams. MEHS, classified as a 3A school by the Alaska School Activities Association, has made repeated runs to state championships with its basketball teams.  The Lady Braves program has done exceptionally well in region play;  since 1993-1994 the Lady Braves have made fourteen appearances at the state tournament.  In the 2008–2009 season, the Lady Braves made the school's first appearance at a state basketball championship game, playing Anchorage Christian Schools (ACS), eventually losing 32–28. In 2010, the Lady Braves captured the school's first state basketball championship after defeating ACS 32–26. In 2014, the Lady Braves made a repeat appearance at the state championship, eventually losing to ACS. Besides basketball, its competitive drama, debate and forensic team has been successful at the state level, winning a state championship in drama in 2004, and the school has produced many quality wrestling and volleyball teams as well. In recent years, the Lady Braves volleyball team has been successful.  Since 2005 they have finished as the Class 3A State runner-up three times, and won state championships in 2011 and 2012.  Historically, Edgecumbe was known for its running; in the 1960s and early 1970s MEHS won 11 consecutive regional championships in cross-country.  Their last regional championship was in 2008. In 2011 and 2014, the Lady Braves volleyball team advanced to state and took first place.

All wrestling matches, volleyball and basketball games are played at the B.J. McGillis Field House, a former World War II-era aircraft hangar.  Being one of the larger sports venues in Southeast Alaska, rivalry games and region championships often hold crowds exceeding 1,500 spectators.  The site boasts standard bleachers, reserved seating, a press box, a climbing wall, wrestling mats, and a weight training center.  It is the only school in the region with a gymnasium large enough to hold two basketball courts.

MEHS's traditional rivals include its cross-town 3A rival Sitka High School (their matchups are known as the "Battle of the Bridge", alluding to the respective schools' locations on different sides of the John O'Connell Bridge) and other 3A rival, Petersburg High School in Petersburg.  In the school's earliest years, they enjoyed another cross-town rivalry with Sheldon Jackson High School, a sectarian boarding school which later became Sheldon Jackson College.

Enrollment and demographics
Mt. Edgecumbe expanded from 370 to 400 students in 2004.  The Alaska Department of Education & Early Development reported that the school had an enrollment of 421 students on October 1, 2014: 109 freshmen, 110 sophomores, 106 juniors and 96 seniors.  The school normally has 140 openings, while 300 students usually apply every year.  In 2005, over 100 communities throughout Alaska were represented among MEHS's student body.

Ninety percent of MEHS's student body is Alaska Native, with the majority hailing from rural Alaska.  The school makes some efforts to promote the cultural identity of Alaska Natives;  there are several student-led Alaska Native dance groups.

Sister school

See also

 List of high schools in Alaska
 List of school districts in Alaska
 Native American boarding schools

References

External links
 
 
 "Mt. Edgecumbe High School Masterplan." Northwind Architects. Includes a map of the Mt. Edgecumbe campus.

1947 establishments in Alaska
Boarding schools in Alaska
Educational institutions established in 1947
Native American boarding schools
Public boarding schools in the United States
Public high schools in Alaska
School districts in Alaska
Schools in Sitka, Alaska
State agencies of Alaska
Native American history of Alaska